Styrbordsknattane Peaks is a cluster of small peaks just north of Kjolrabbane Hills, near the southwest end of Ahlmann Ridge in Queen Maud Land. Mapped by Norwegian cartographers from surveys and air photos by Norwegian-British-Swedish Antarctic Expedition (NBSAE) (1949–52) and named Styrbordsknattane (the starboard peaks).

Mountains of Queen Maud Land
Princess Martha Coast